Aureimonas is a genus of marine bacteria from the family of Aurantimonadaceae.

References

Hyphomicrobiales
Bacteria genera